The Gallo-Italic of Basilicata is a group of Gallo-Italic dialects found in Basilicata in southern Italy, that could date back to migrations from Northern Italy during the time of the Normans.

These dialects are found in two areas: one near the regional capital of Potenza (in Tito, Picerno, Pignola and Vaglio Basilicata), but not in Castelmezzano, and another on the Tyrrhenian coast (Trecchina, Rivello, Nemoli and San Costantino).

Similar communities have survived in Sicily, speaking Gallo-Italic dialects of Sicily.

References

Sources
 
  

Gallo-Italic languages
Languages of Italy